The 1960 North Carolina Tar Heels baseball team represented University of North Carolina at Chapel Hill in the 1960 NCAA University Division baseball season. The Tar Heels played their home games at Emerson Field. The team was coached by Walter Rabb in his 14th year as head coach at North Carolina.

The Tar Heels won the District III playoff to advance to the College World Series, where they were defeated by the Oklahoma State Cowboys.

Roster

Schedule

|-
! style="" | Regular Season
|-

|-
! bgcolor="#DDDDFF" width="3%" | #
! bgcolor="#DDDDFF" width="7%" | Date
! bgcolor="#DDDDFF" width="14%" | Opponent
! bgcolor="#DDDDFF" width="25%" | Site/Stadium
! bgcolor="#DDDDFF" width="5%" | Score
! bgcolor="#DDDDFF" width="5%" | Overall Record
! bgcolor="#DDDDFF" width="5%" | ACC Record
|- align="center" bgcolor="#ffcccc"
| 1 || March 21 || at  || Perry Field • Gainesville, Florida || 0–19 || 0–1 || –
|- align="center" bgcolor="#ccffcc"
| 2 || March 22 || at Florida || Perry Field • Gainesville, Florida || 3–1 || 1–1 || –
|- align="center" bgcolor="#ccffcc"
| 3 || March 23 || at Florida || Perry Field • Gainesville, Florida || 6–4 || 2–1 || –
|- align="center" bgcolor="#ccffcc"
| 4 || March 25 ||  || Emerson Field • Chapel Hill, North Carolina || 4–2 || 3–1 || –
|- align="center" bgcolor="#ffcccc"
| 5 || March 26 ||  || Emerson Field • Chapel Hill, North Carolina || 8–13 || 3–2 || –
|-

|-
! bgcolor="#DDDDFF" width="3%" | #
! bgcolor="#DDDDFF" width="7%" | Date
! bgcolor="#DDDDFF" width="14%" | Opponent
! bgcolor="#DDDDFF" width="25%" | Site/Stadium
! bgcolor="#DDDDFF" width="5%" | Score
! bgcolor="#DDDDFF" width="5%" | Overall Record
! bgcolor="#DDDDFF" width="5%" | ACC Record
|- align="center" bgcolor="#ccffcc"
| 6 || April 1 ||  || Emerson Field • Chapel Hill, North Carolina || 9–4 || 4–2 || –
|- align="center" bgcolor="#ccffcc"
| 7 || April 5 ||  || Emerson Field • Chapel Hill, North Carolina || 5–2 || 5–2 || –
|- align="center" bgcolor="#ccffcc"
| 8 || April 6 || Delaware || Emerson Field • Chapel Hill, North Carolina || 6–3 || 6–2 || –
|- align="center" bgcolor="#ccffcc"
| 9 || April 7 ||  || Emerson Field • Chapel Hill, North Carolina || 10–5 || 7–2 || –
|- align="center" bgcolor="#ccffcc"
| 10 || April 8 || Colgate || Emerson Field • Chapel Hill, North Carolina || 6–1 || 8–2 || –
|- align="center" bgcolor="#ffcccc"
| 11 || April 9 || at  || Ernie Shore Field • Winston-Salem, North Carolina || 3–4 || 8–3 || 0–1
|- align="center" bgcolor="#ffcccc"
| 12 || April 14 ||  || Emerson Field • Chapel Hill, North Carolina || 4–5 || 8–4 || 0–2
|- align="center" bgcolor="#ffcccc"
| 13 || April 15 ||  || Emerson Field • Chapel Hill, North Carolina || 0–4 || 8–5 || 0–3
|- align="center" bgcolor="#ccffcc"
| 14 || April 16 ||  || Emerson Field • Chapel Hill, North Carolina || 6–5 || 9–5 || 1–3
|- align="center" bgcolor="#ccffcc"
| 15 || April 25 ||  || Emerson Field • Chapel Hill, North Carolina || 13–0 || 10–5 || 2–3
|- align="center" bgcolor="#ccffcc"
| 16 || April 28 ||  || Emerson Field • Chapel Hill, North Carolina || 9–5 || 11–5 || 3–3
|- align="center" bgcolor="#ccffcc"
| 17 || April 30 || at  || Riddick Stadium • Raleigh, North Carolina || 7–2 || 12–5 || 4–3
|-

|-
! bgcolor="#DDDDFF" width="3%" | #
! bgcolor="#DDDDFF" width="7%" | Date
! bgcolor="#DDDDFF" width="14%" | Opponent
! bgcolor="#DDDDFF" width="25%" | Site/Stadium
! bgcolor="#DDDDFF" width="5%" | Score
! bgcolor="#DDDDFF" width="5%" | Overall Record
! bgcolor="#DDDDFF" width="5%" | ACC Record
|- align="center" bgcolor="#ccffcc"
| 18 || May 2 || at Maryland || Shipley Field • College Park, Maryland || 10–3 || 13–5 || 5–3
|- align="center" bgcolor="#ccffcc"
| 19 || May 3 || at Virginia || UVA Baseball Field • Charlottesville, Virginia || 2–6 || 14–5 || 6–3
|- align="center" bgcolor="#ccffcc"
| 20 || May 6 || Wake Forest || Emerson Field • Chapel Hill, North Carolina || 2–1 || 15–5 || 7–3
|- align="center" bgcolor="#ccffcc"
| 21 || May 9 || at Clemson || Riggs Field • Clemson, South Carolina || 6–3 || 16–5 || 8–3
|- align="center" bgcolor="#ccffcc"
| 22 || May 10 || at South Carolina || Unknown • Columbia, South Carolina || 3–2 || 17–5 || 9–3
|- align="center" bgcolor="#ccffcc"
| 23 || May 12 || NC State || Emerson Field • Chapel Hill, North Carolina || 1–0 || 18–5 || 10–3
|- align="center" bgcolor="#ccffcc"
| 24 || May 14 || at Duke || Jack Coombs Field • Durham, North Carolina || 6–3 || 19–5 || 11–3
|-

|-
! style="" | Postseason
|-

|-
! bgcolor="#DDDDFF" width="3%" | #
! bgcolor="#DDDDFF" width="7%" | Date
! bgcolor="#DDDDFF" width="14%" | Opponent
! bgcolor="#DDDDFF" width="25%" | Site/Stadium
! bgcolor="#DDDDFF" width="5%" | Score
! bgcolor="#DDDDFF" width="5%" | Overall Record
! bgcolor="#DDDDFF" width="5%" | ACC Record
|- align="center" bgcolor="#ccffcc"
| 25 || May 3 || vs  || Sims Legion Park • Gastonia, North Carolina || 2–1 || 20–5 || 11–3
|- align="center" bgcolor="#ccffcc"
| 26 || May 6 || vs   || Sims Legion Park • Gastonia, North Carolina || 13–1 || 21–5 || 11–3
|- align="center" bgcolor="#ccffcc"
| 27 || May 6 || vs Florida || Sims Legion Park • Gastonia, North Carolina || 7–5 || 22–5 || 11–3
|-

|-
! bgcolor="#DDDDFF" width="3%" | #
! bgcolor="#DDDDFF" width="7%" | Date
! bgcolor="#DDDDFF" width="14%" | Opponent
! bgcolor="#DDDDFF" width="25%" | Site/Stadium
! bgcolor="#DDDDFF" width="5%" | Score
! bgcolor="#DDDDFF" width="5%" | Overall Record
! bgcolor="#DDDDFF" width="5%" | ACC Record
|- align="center" bgcolor="#ffcccc"
| 28 || May 14 || vs Minnesota || Omaha Municipal Stadium • Omaha, Nebraska || 3–8 || 22–6 || 11–3
|- align="center" bgcolor="#ffcccc"
| 29 || May 15 || vs Oklahoma State || Omaha Municipal Stadium • Omaha, Nebraska || 0–7 || 22–7 || 11–3
|-

|-
|

Awards and honors
John Burgwyn
First Team All-ACC

Gerald Griffin
First Team All-ACC

Ferg Norton
First Team All-ACC

Wayne Young
First Team All-ACC
Second Team All-American

References

North Carolina Tar Heels baseball seasons
North Carolina Tar Heels baseball
College World Series seasons
North Carolina
Atlantic Coast Conference baseball champion seasons